The 1937–38 season was Colchester United's first ever season after the formation as a professional club from amateur predecessors Colchester Town. Alongside competing in the Southern League, the club also participated in the Southern League Mid-Week Section and Southern League Cup. The club did not enter the FA Cup, but did win the Southern League Cup at the first attempt. Colchester finished 6th position in the league, and finished as runners-up to Millwall Reserves in the Mid-Week Section.

Season overview
During a transitional period from the amateur organisation at Colchester Town to a professional club, twelve directors formed the board, appointing former Huddersfield Town goalkeeper and Bath City manager Ted Davis to take charge of team affairs. On 14 July 1937, the announcement was publicly made that the new club would be named Colchester United. A week after his appointment, Davis had already organised for the club to play in the same blue and white striped kit as his former club Huddersfield.

With trial matches taking place between 19 and 26 August 1937, Colchester United played their first ever professional match on 28 August 1937, travelling to The Huish to face Yeovil & Petters United. The game ended 3–0 to Yeovil, but Colchester made amends in their first game at Layer Road against Davis' old side Bath City on 2 September in the Mid-Week Section. The U's thrashed their counterparts 6–1, with Reg Smith registering the club's first hat-trick. Proficient bugle and cornet player Ronnie Dunn, Colchester's goalkeeper, welcomed the players of both sides to the pitch with a rendition of the post horn galop, a tradition which would remain throughout the club's years at Layer Road. The attendance was recorded as £250 instead of numbers of supporters, with the amount equating to an approximate attendance of 3,500. Two days later, an estimated 11,000 came to Layer Road to witness a 3–3 draw in the first meeting between Colchester United and nearby rivals Ipswich Town.

Reg Smith was sold to Wolverhampton Wanderers in October 1937 for £250, and with a deal agreed for Cliff Fairchild to join Arsenal at the end of the season for £500, Davis used his entrepreneurial skills to arrange for both First Division clubs to contest the Colchester Challenge Cup at Layer Road. The friendly fixture proved to be a success, with 17,584 seeing Wolves beat Arsenal 1–0.

Following an excellent beginning to Colchester United's existence spelt a swift demise for Colchester Town. With the Oysters suffering financial difficulty, the amateur club folded in 1937, having joined the six-club Essex Senior League. The club re-emerged briefly in January 1938 to complete an Essex Senior Cup tie in order to avoid a fine, but the withdrawal of Town meant that United could enter a reserve side into the Eastern Counties League one month later, with the reserve squad boosted by many of those previously on the books with Colchester Town.

Layer Road suffered severe damage to the roof in January 1938 during a severe gale, with a recently erected corrugated iron roof and timber structure damaging nearby buildings, causing the ground to be closed for two days to clear the debris.

The return match with Ipswich saw 8,000 Colchester fans set a new Portman Road ground record attendance of 23,890, with United wearing a new orange and black away strip. They had worn these kits a week earlier in a friendly against Charlton Athletic to acclimatise themselves to the new strip.

At the end of the season, Colchester finished mid-table, but did reach the Southern League Cup final. They lost the first leg 2–1 at Yeovil, but triumphed 3–1 at Layer Road to win 4–3 on aggregate and secure the club's first ever trophy. The club then adopted the nickname "The U's" to differentiate themselves from "The Oysters" of Colchester Town. Across the season, Colchester found the back of the net 155 times in all competitions, with Alec Cheyne scoring 35 goals, Arthur Pritchard 29 goals and Jack Hodge 24 goals helping the U's to that total. With professional football proving to be a success, the same applied for Colchester's neighbours and rivals Ipswich Town, who were elected to the Football League for the 1938–39 season.

Players

Transfers

In

 Total spending:  ~ £3,500

Out

 Total incoming:  ~ £500

Match details

Friendlies

Southern League

League table

Matches

Southern League Mid-Week Section

League table

Matches

Southern League Cup

Squad statistics

Appearances and goals

|-
!colspan="12"|Players who appeared for Colchester who left during the season

|}

Goalscorers

Disciplinary record

Captains
Number of games played as team captain.

Clean sheets
Number of games goalkeepers kept a clean sheet.

Player debuts
Players making their first-team Colchester United debut in a fully competitive match.

See also
List of Colchester United F.C. seasons

References

General

Specific

1937-38
English football clubs 1937–38 season